Camilo Ponce Enríquez is a parish in the Azuay province in southern Ecuador. It is the seat of the Camilo Ponce Enríquez canton and is located roughly 230 miles southwest of Quito, the capital city of Ecuador.

It is named for Camilo Ponce Enríquez (1912–1976), who served as president of Ecuador from 1956 to 1960.

The municipality covers an area of 118.8 square kilometres.

References

External links 
 Municipio de Camilo Ponce Enríquez

Populated places in Azuay Province
Parishes of Ecuador